"Two More Bottles of Wine" is a song written by Delbert McClinton and recorded by American country music artist Emmylou Harris. It was released in April 1978 as the first single from the album Quarter Moon in a Ten Cent Town. "Two More Bottles of Wine" topped the U.S. country singles chart that June. A live version by Sheryl Crow and Vince Gill appears on the 2016 CD The Life & Songs of Emmylou Harris: An All-Star Concert Celebration.

Content
In the song, the narrator moves with his/her lover to Los Angeles, 1,600 miles away from their home, in search of success, but the lover abruptly leaves. The narrator is then left to fend for him/herself, eventually working in a menial job "sweeping out a warehouse in West L.A." but eventually concludes it is all right because he/she still has "two more bottles of wine".

Charts

References
 

1978 singles
1978 songs
Emmylou Harris songs
Songs written by Delbert McClinton
Song recordings produced by Brian Ahern (producer)
Songs about alcohol
Warner Records singles